The X series is a collection of compilation albums and DVDs released by BEC Recordings promoting Christian rock music from bands signed to Capitol Christian Music Group, specifically Tooth & Nail Records, Solid State Records, Gotee Records, ForeFront Records, Sparrow Records, Fervent Records, Flicker Records, Essential Records, Inpop Records and INO Records. The color of 'X' 2012 was red-orange and was released on April 3, 2012.

Rock Compilations 

The rock compilations promote general Christian rock and have a little variety into metal, hip-hop, and rap.

X 2003

Disc 1

Disc 2

X 2004

X 2005

X 2006

X 2007

X 2008 

 Notes

X 2008 also came with a secret link that you could use to download a "New Music Sampler".

X 2008: New Rock Sampler

X Christmas 

X Christmas features some of BEC Recordings top bands showing their stuff for Christmas.

X 2009 

 Notes

This is the first time that Capital Lights, Philmont, and Since October have been on an X album, although Capital Lights performed "His Favorite Christmas Story" on X Christmas.

X 2010

X 2011

X 2012

DVDs 

The X Series DVDs are a compilation of Christian music videos promoting the same artists as the rock compilations. They began the same year as the rock compilations, in 2003.

X 2003

X 2004

X 2005

X 2006

X 2007

X 2008 

X 2008: The Videos includes eight bonus videos by the following artists:
nevertheless, Chasing Victory The Send, Future of Forestry, Ruth, Manafest, Project 86, and Seventh Day Slumber.

X 2009 

X 2009 is sold with a bonus DVD of Christian Rock  music videos from various artists, which is the first X album to do so. This is the video listing for the DVD.

 tobymac, Lose My Soul
 Family Force 5, Radiator
 Hawk Nelson, Friend Like That
 Skillet, Comatose (Live)
 Jeremy Camp, Speaking Louder than Before
 Underoath, Desperate Times Desperate Measures
 Thousand Foot Krutch, Favorite Disease
 The Almost, Southern Weather
 Sanctus Real, Whatever You're Doing
 Demon Hunter, Carry Me Down
 Seabird, The Rescue
 Article One, Without You I'm Not Alright
 Run Kid Run, One in a Million
 Philmont, The Difference
 Since October, Disaster
 Capital Lights, Outrage
 Children 18:3, All My Balloons
 Ruth, Back to the Five

X Worship 

The X Worship compilations, which began in 2006 and ended in 2007, promoted lighter Christian rock, rather than the general rock theme.

X Worship 2006

X Worship 2007

References 

Compilation album series
2000s compilation albums
Christian music compilation albums